Ainley Top is a village in Calderdale, West Yorkshire in England. It is situated on a hill (the Ainleys) with the M62 motorway to the north, and junction 24 of the motorway adjacent to the village. It is in the Elland ward of Calderdale Metropolitan Borough Council with 419 registered electors in 248 properties in 2013.

Ainley Top is also the name of the roundabout just south of the village.  This is the junction of the A643 and the A629 and also gives access to junction 24 of the M62 motorway.

References

Geography of Calderdale
Geography of Huddersfield